Jorge Marcelo Holguín Mallarino (30 October 1848 – 2 March 1928) was a Colombian politician and military officer, two time Acting President of Colombia: June–August 1909 as interim president, and from November 1921 to August 1922. He also served a term as Minister of Foreign Affairs in which he signed the Holguín-Avebury treaty.

Early life
He was born  in Cali, Valle del Cauca Department, Republic of New Granada. His brother was Carlos Holguín Mallarino. He became a businessman, soldier, journalist, writer, and politician. He served in both the Colombian Civil War of 1876 and the Colombian Civil War of 1895.

Career 
He was Minister of Foreign Affairs from 1897 until 1898, and again from 7 August 1918 – 16 September 1918. He was Minister of Finance from 7 August 1904 – 15 December 1904, and 11 March 1909 – 22 March 1909. He was Minister of War from 22 March 1909 – 7 June 1909 and President of Colombia from 11 November 1921 – 7 August 1922.
 
He died in 1928 in Bogotá, Cundinamarca, Colombia.

Personal life

He was Roman Catholic . His wife Cecilia Arboleda Mosquera was mother of his 12 children. He is related to María Ángela Holguín.

References

Further reading
Biblioteca Luis Angel Arango; Jorge Marcelo Holguín Mallarino

Colombian Roman Catholics
Colombian people of Spanish descent
Presidential Designates of Colombia
Colombian Conservative Party politicians
Jorge
Presidents of Colombia
Foreign ministers of Colombia
Colombian Ministers of War
Colombian generals
Mallarino family
People from Cali
1848 births
1928 deaths

Burials at Central Cemetery of Bogotá